Lubański (masculine) or Lubańska (feminine) may refer to:

 Lubanski (surname)
 Lubań County (Polish: powiat lubański), a place in south-western Poland
 Henryków Lubański, a village in Lubań County
Włoszyca Lubańska, a village in Włocławek County